Adult Contemporary is a chart published by Billboard ranking the top-performing songs in the United States in the adult contemporary music (AC) market.  In 1986, 25 songs topped the chart, then published under the title Hot Adult Contemporary, based on playlists submitted by radio stations.

In the year's first issue of Billboard the number one song was "Say You, Say Me" by Lionel Richie, which was in its fifth week at number one.  It held the top spot for a single week in 1986 before being replaced by "That's What Friends Are For" by Dionne & Friends.  A charity single intended to raise funds for HIV/AIDS-related causes, the song was performed by Dionne Warwick with Elton John, Gladys Knight and Stevie Wonder.  After two weeks in the top spot, it was replaced by Wonder's solo single "Go Home".  Three months later, Wonder returned to number one with "Overjoyed", making him the only artist to achieve three AC chart-toppers in 1986.  Among the acts to top the chart for the first time during the year was the duo of Gloria Loring and Carl Anderson.  Loring portrayed the character Liz Chandler on the soap opera Days of Our Lives and in her role as a singer performed the song "Friends and Lovers" with guest star Anderson.  The song was not initially released commercially, but after a version by Juice Newton and Eddie Rabbitt entered the country charts, Loring and Anderson's recording was released and topped the AC chart.  Rabbitt and Newton's version of the song topped Billboards Hot Country Singles chart in October, meaning that versions of the same song by two different acts were number ones in their respective genres within a month of each other.

Peter Cetera had the highest total number of weeks at number one in 1986, spending seven weeks in the top spot.  After nearly two decades as lead singer of the band Chicago, he had departed the group for a solo career in 1985.  He spent five weeks atop the chart in July and August with his first single since quitting Chicago, "Glory of Love", and returned to number one for two weeks in November with "The Next Time I Fall", a duet with Amy Grant.  "Glory of Love", from the soundtrack of the film The Karate Kid Part II, tied for the year's longest unbroken run at number one with Whitney Houston's "Greatest Love of All".  Both songs also topped Billboards all-genre singles chart, the Hot 100, as did eight of the year's other AC chart-toppers.  The year's final Hot Adult Contemporary number one was "Love Is Forever" by Billy Ocean, which held the top spot for the final two weeks of 1986.  It was the second chart-topper of the year for the Trinidad-born singer.

Chart history

a.  Dionne & Friends consisted of Dionne Warwick, Elton John, Gladys Knight and Stevie Wonder

See also
1986 in music
List of artists who reached number one on the U.S. Adult Contemporary chart

References

1986
1986 record charts
1986 in American music